The Mayor of Hawaii is the chief executive officer of the County of Hawaii in the state of Hawaii. The mayor has municipal jurisdiction over the Big Island of Hawaii.  The current mayor is Mitch Roth. The Mayor of Hawaii County is the successor of the Royal Governors of Hawaii Island of the Kingdom of Hawaii.

History 
Hawaii County began electing a mayor in 1968 when the present form of charter government was instituted. For most of the 20th century elected members of the Board of Supervisors, precursor to the Hawaii County Council, chose the chairman, and that chairman was essentially the chief operating officer of Hawaii County. That changed in 1964 a year after Act 73 of the 1963 Legislature which enabled counties to draft their own charters. Former Honolulu deputy County Corporation Counsel Shunichi Kimura was elected the last County Chairman in 1964 and the County elected its first mayor in 1968. Bruce McCall (1976), Megumi Kon (1984) and Larry Tanimoto (1990) all filled out the last few months of their predecessor's terms, in the case of Tanimoto, for Bernard Akana, who died of cancer less than two years into his term. Lorraine Inouye then won a special election to serve out Akana's last two years.

Past Mayors

References